The women's 800 metres event at the 2007 Pan American Games was held on July 23–24.

Medalists

Results

Heats
Qualification: First 3 of each heat (Q) and the next 2 fastest (q) qualified for the final.

Final

References

Official results

800
2007
2007 in women's athletics